TerraView is a GIS application built on the TerraLib GIS library. TerraView  handles vector data (polygons, lines, points) and raster data (grids and images), both of them stored in a relational or geo-relational database, including ACCESS, PostgreSQL, MySQL and Oracle Spatial. TerraView has a visualization interface that allows attribute and spatial queries on object in geographical database. The interface allows different views on the database, producing thematic maps with different types of legends.

TerraView is able to manage raster data in geographical database and allows the visualization and manipulation of raster data together with vector data. Raster data can be shared in different formats such as GeoTIFF, TIFF, JPEG, RAW, ASCII-Grid or ASCIISpring.

TerraView supports vector operations including intersection and buffer maps. It also has statistical analysis functions: local and global autocorrelation indexes, semivariograms, and regionalisation. 

TerraView is free software distributed under the GPL license and is available on the Internet .

External links

Partners 
 INPE - National Institute for Space Research.
 Tecgraf - the Computer Graphics Technology Group of PUC-Rio.
 FUNCATE - Foundation for the Space Science, Applied Research and Technology.

More information 
 Official project web site

Related projects 
 TerraLib project.

Free GIS software